John Perry "Rip" Major (December 26, 1889 – January 21, 1934) was an American football player, coach of football, basketball, and baseball, and college athletics administrator.  He served as the head football coach at Wofford College in 1919 and again from 1922 to 1926, compiling a record of 19–34–1.

Auburn
Major was a prominent running back for Mike Donahue's Auburn Tigers of Auburn University. He was also a center on the basketball team.

1912
Major was captain of the team in 1912. He was selected All-Southern.

Wofford
Major coached the Wofford Terriers football teams of Wofford College in 1919 and from 1922 to 1926.

Head coaching record

Football

References

1889 births
1934 deaths
American football fullbacks
American football quarterbacks
Centers (basketball)
Auburn Tigers football players
Auburn Tigers men's basketball players
Clemson Tigers football coaches
Wofford Terriers athletic directors
Wofford Terriers baseball coaches
Wofford Terriers football coaches
Wofford Terriers men's basketball coaches
All-Southern college football players
Sportspeople from Auburn, Alabama
Players of American football from Alabama
Basketball coaches from Alabama